Sherrie Patrice Marshall (born August 3, 1953) is an American attorney who served as a Commissioner of the Federal Communications Commission from 1989 to 1993. A member of the Republican Party, Marshall was formerly an attorney at Wiley, Rein, & Felding, and served under President Ronald Reagan as assistant White House Counsel.

References

1953 births
Living people
Members of the Federal Communications Commission
Florida Republicans
George H. W. Bush administration personnel
Clinton administration personnel
People from Jacksonville, Florida